The Ciunget (also: Argintărie) is a left tributary of the river Dofteana in Romania. Its source is in the Nemira Mountains.

References

Rivers of Romania
Rivers of Bacău County